Vasily Egorovich Raev (1808–1871) was a Russian painter and member of the Imperial Academy of Arts.

Biography

He was originally a serf, belonging to a Mr.Kushelev, who later gave him his freedom. He received his initial training at a private painting school in Arzamas, operated by Alexander Stupin. He continued his studies at the Imperial Academy of Arts in St. Petersburg, with Mikhail Matveevich Ivanov.

In 1837, he made a trip to the Caucasus, bringing back numerous sketches of the Ural and Altai mountains. In 1840, the Academy awarded him the title of "Artist" (no-class). In 1842, he was sent abroad as a pensioner of the Academy. While in Rome, in addition to painting, he studied mosaics. In 1849, he was forced to return to Russia, due to continuing political unrest in Italy. 

For two years, he worked on creating mosaics. He was recognized as an Academician in 1851. He went abroad again in 1854. In the last years of his life he was engaged in painting in the Byzantine Style.

He was also a sought-after teacher. His students included Ivan Aivazovsky, Mikhail Lebedev, and Alexey Bogolyubov.

Among his best known works are a view of Rome from Monte Mario and the "Vision of Alypius".

Selected paintings

References

Literary sources

External links 

Vasily Raev - Artworks @ the Athenaeum
Vasili Egorovich Raev @ AskArt

1808 births
1871 deaths
People from Kholmsky Uyezd (Pskov Governorate)
Russian artists